Mary, mother of James is identified in the synoptic gospels as one of the women who went to Jesus' tomb after he was buried.  and  refer to "Mary the mother of James" as one of the Myrrhbearers, the women who went to the tomb of Jesus.

Along with Mary Magdalene and Mary of Clopas, Mary the mother of James is known as one of the Three Marys.

Background
 says that "Mary the mother of James and Joseph" was watching the crucifixion from a distance.  calls her "Mary the mother of James the younger and of Joses". James the younger is often identified with James, son of Alphaeus. The Catholic Encyclopedia identifies him with both James, son of Alphaeus and James the brother of Jesus (James the Just). 

According to the surviving fragments of the work Exposition of the Sayings of the Lord of the Apostolic Father Papias of Hierapolis, who lived c. 70–163 AD, "Mary, mother of James the Less and Joseph, wife of Alphaeus was the sister of Mary the mother of the Lord, whom John names of Cleophas". For the Anglican theologian J.B. Lightfoot, this fragment quoted above would be spurious.

Her relics are said to be both in France at the Church of the Saintes Maries de la Mer, and in Italy.

See also
 New Testament people named Mary

References

1st-century Christian female saints
Angelic visionaries
Followers of Jesus
People celebrated in the Lutheran liturgical calendar
Saints from the Holy Land
Women in the New Testament
Gospel of Mark
Gospel of Luke
Myrrhbearers
The Three Marys